Israel Cruz is an Australian singer-songwriter and record producer. Cruz was born in Quezon City, Philippines and at the age of 3 moved to Melbourne, Australia with his family. He lives in Sydney, Australia with friends and has written and performed with Australian singer Stan Walker.

Career
His single, "Party Up", was released as a digital download and an extended play. It peaked at number 33 on the Australian Singles Chart, becoming Cruz's highest-charting single since 2004's "Old Skool Luv". "Party Up" was certified Gold by the Australian Recording Industry Association (ARIA) for shipping 35,000 copies. Regarding the song's reception, Cruz stated in an interview with Dominic Di Francesco of Rhyme and Reason: "I feel like it’s been good. For me, it’s not about having a No.1 record. I focus on making good music that the people like. I’ve seen so many artists have so much more than me [with regards to] the deals that they get. But I haven’t needed a job since about 2004. I’ve learnt how to make money off music. I just love putting out records and I love the response "Party Up" has been getting. I feel like I'm always going to be the guy who makes these street anthems. One day, if it crosses over, thank God. But my thing is making music I like, putting it out and if the people love it – great!"

Discography

Albums

Singles

Featured singles

Songwriting credits 
Elen Levon
"Naughty" (produced, featured)
Jessica Mauboy
"Been Waiting" (co-wrote, produced)
"What Happened to Us" (co-wrote, co-produced)
Ricki-Lee Coulter
"Wiggle It" (co-wrote, produced)
Stan Walker
"All I Need" (co-wrote, produced)
"One Thing" (co-wrote, produced)
Scarlett Belle
"Lover Boy" (also produced)
Tinchy Stryder
"Famous" (also produced)

Awards and nominations

References

1983 births
Living people
Filipino emigrants to Australia
Australian contemporary R&B singers
Australian people of Filipino descent
Australian male dancers
Australian hip hop musicians
Australian record producers
Musicians from Sydney
Musicians from Quezon City
21st-century Australian singers
21st-century Australian male singers
Rappers from Sydney